Liolaemus eleodori, also known commonly as Eleodor's tree iguana, is a species of lizard in the family  Liolaemidae. The species is native to Argentina.

Etymology
The specific name, eleodori, is in honor of Eleodoro Sánchez, an employee of the Fauna Division of the government of San Juan Province, Argentina, for his support of field research.

Geographic range
L. eleodori is found in San Juan Province, Argentina.

Habitat

Reproduction
The mode of reproduction of L. eleodori has been described as viviparous and as ovoviviparous.

References

Further reading
Cei JM, Etheridge RE, Videla F (1985). "Especies nuevas de iguanidos del noroeste de la provincia de San Juan (Riserva Provincial San Guillermo), Argentina ". Deserta 7: 316–323. (Liolaemus eleodori, new species, p. 317). (in Spanish).

eleodori
Reptiles described in 1985
Reptiles of Argentina
Taxa named by José Miguel Alfredo María Cei
Taxa named by Richard Emmett Etheridge